K. R. Meera (born 19 February 1970) is an Indian author and journalist, who writes in Malayalam. She was born in Sasthamkotta, Kollam district in Kerala. She worked as a journalist in Malayala Manorama but later resigned to concentrate more on writing. She started writing fiction in 2001 and her first short story collection Ormayude Njarambu was published in 2002. Since then she has published five collections of short stories, two novellas, five novels and two children's books. She won the Kerala Sahitya Akademi Award in 2009 for her short-story, Ave Maria. Her novel Aarachaar (2012) is widely regarded as one of the best literary works produced in Malayalam language. It received several awards including the Kerala Sahitya Akademi Award (2013), Odakkuzhal Award (2013), Vayalar Award (2014) and Kendra Sahitya Akademi Award (2015). It was also shortlisted for the 2016 DSC Prize for South Asian Literature.

Biography  
Meera was born in Sasthamkotta, Kollam district in Kerala as the daughter of Ramachandran Pillai and Amritakumari, both professors. She completed her predegree from D.B College, Sasthamcotta. She passed her master's degree in Communicative English from Gandhigram Rural Institute, Dindigul, Tamil Nadu.

Meera lives in Kottayam with her husband M.S. Dileep, who is a journalist with Malayala Manorama. Their only daughter Shruti was a residential student at the Rishi Valley School, Andhra Pradesh.

Journalism 
In 1993, she joined as a journalist in Kottayam-based Malayalam daily Malayala Manorama, and was the first female journalist to be hired at the newspaper. In 2006, following publication of several stories, Meera gave up journalism to take up writing as a full-time occupation. She was the senior sub-editor of Malayala Manorama when she resigned. During her journalistic career, she published many special stories which won her numerous awards and recognitions. She won the PUCL Human Rights National Award for Journalism in 1998 for an investigative series on the plight of women labourers in Kerala. This series also won the Chowara Parameswaran Award instituted by Kerala Press Academy. A series on children won her the Deepalaya National Journalism Award for Child Rights in 2001.

Writing 
Meera's first published work was a story submitted to Mathrubhumi, a magazine, in 2000.  Her first short story collection Ormayude Njarambu was published in 2002. This collection won the Gita Hiranyan Endowment Award instituted by Kerala Sahitya Akademi and Ankanam Literary Award. Her next book Mohamanja was published in 2004. It was translated into English by J. Devika as Yellow is the Colour of Longing (Penguin, 2011). The title story, which explores the absurdity of desire, was also published in Arshilata: Women's Fiction from India and Bangladesh (ed. Niaz Zaman). She won the Kerala Sahitya Akademi Award in 2008 for the collection Ave Maria. The title story of the book is a brutal glimpse into the debris of Kerala's Communist ideology, the fault lines left behind in families. A translation of this story was included in the book First Proof 5, The Penguin Book of New Writing from India (Penguin, 2010). Her other collections include K. R. Meerayude Kathakal, a collection of major 26 stories published so far, including Machakathe Thachan, Ormayude Njarambu, Mohamanja, Ave Maria, Karineela, Malakhayude Marukukal, Soorpanakha, Alif Laila and Ottapalam Kadakkuvolam.

Her early novels include Aa Maratheyum Marannu Marannu Njan, Meera Saadhu, Nethronmeelanam and Yudasinte Suvishesham. Meera Sadhu (DC Books, 2008) tells the story of an IIT graduate abandoned at a Krishna temple after going through some torrid times in her married life. Five of her short novels have been compiled into a single book titled Meerayude Novellakal (2014).

Aarachaar, widely regarded as her masterpiece, was originally serialised in Madhyamam Weekly and was published as a book by DC Books in 2012. Set in Bengal, it tells the story of a family of executioners with a long lineage, beginning in the fourth century BC. The protagonist of the novel, Chetna, is a strong and tenacious woman who struggles to inherit this profession. According to noted literary critic M. Leelavathy, Aarachaar is one of the best literary works produced in Malayalam and follows the legacy of O. V. Vijayan's classic work Khasakkinte Itihasam. The novel received the 2013 Kerala Sahitya Akademi Award. It was also awarded the prestigious Odakkuzhal Award in 2013, Vayalar Award in 2014 and Sahitya Akademi Award in 2015. Aarachaar was translated into English by J. Devika as The Hangwoman. The novel has sold more than 38000 copies (as of 2015 January). The novel was translated into English by J. Devika under the title Hangwoman: Everyone Loves a Good Hanging (Hamish Hamilton, 2014). Hangwoman was shortlisted for the prestigious DSC Prize for South Asian Literature 2016. Her latest novel Sooryane Aninja Oru Stree is being published in Vanitha magazine.

She has also been noted as a screenplay writer of four serials. She was credited as the associate in writing for the film Ore Kadal, a National Award winner. She is also a well-known column-writer in Malayalam.

Themes 
Meera cites the work of a number of Indian authors as influencing her work, including E V Krishna Pillai, Kamala Das, T Padmanabhan, S V Venugopan Nair, Anand, M Mukundan, C V Sriraman, O N V Kurup, and Sugathakumari. Amongst non-Indian writers, she cites Gabriel Garcia Marquez as a primary influence. Her work explores themes relating to patriarchy, discrimination, and individuality, focusing on the inner lives of women and challenging traditional power dynamics. Meera has described her work as engaging with her political environment, stating, "Every writer is a political writer. It is very difficult for any writer to shut down from what is happening in and around society. And as a writer, we reflect on what’s happening in society through our writing. Writing’s a mixture of conscious and unconscious creative thinking— intuition and craft—it feels very unnatural to analyse it in any other kind of systematic way.”

Awards and honours 
 2004: Lalithambika Sahitya Award
 2004: Gita Hiranyan Endowment Award by Kerala Sahitya Akademi - Ormayude Njarampu
 2009: Kerala Sahitya Akademi Award for Story - Ave Maria
 2013: Odakkuzhal Award - Aarachaar
 2013: Kerala Sahitya Akademi Award for Novel - Aarachaar
2014: Vayalar Award - Aarachaar
 2015: Kendra Sahitya Akademi Award - Aarachaar
 2016: Shortlisted for the DSC Prize for South Asian Literature - Hangwoman (Translated by J. Devika)
 2018: Muttathu Varkey Award - Aarachaar

Bibliography

Novels
 Nethronmeelanam
 Meerasadhu (translated to English by Ministhy S. as The Poison of Love)
 Yudasinte Suvishesham[The Gospel of Yudas]
 Malakayude Marukukal
 Karineela
 Aa Maratheyum Marannu Marannu Njan (And Slowly Forgetting that Tree)
 Aarachaar (2012) (Hangwoman: Everyone Loves a Good Hanging)
 Sooryane Aninja Oru Sthree
Ghathakan (The Assassin)
 Khabar

Collections of short stories
 Sarpayajnam G(2001)
 Ormayude Njarambu (2002) (The Vein of Memory)
 Moha Manja (2004) (Yellow is the Colour of Longing)
 Ave Maria
 K. R. Meerayude Kathakal
 Guillotine
 Meerayude Novellakal  (2014)
 Penpanjatandram[2016]
 Bhagavante Maranam[2017]

Memoirs  

 Mazhayil Parakkunna Pakshikal
 Ente Jeevitattile Chilar
 Kadhayezhuth

References

External links
 "Yellow is the Colour of Longing". (The Daily Star)
 https://web.archive.org/web/20100906183453/http://www.sasthamcotta.com/K%20R%20Meera.html
 http://www.womenswriting.com/WomensWriting/AuthorProfileDetail.asp?AuthorID=127

Living people
1970 births
Indian women short story writers
Malayalam-language writers
Malayalam novelists
Malayalam short story writers
People from Kollam district
Indian women novelists
Recipients of the Sahitya Akademi Award in Malayalam
Recipients of the Kerala Sahitya Akademi Award
21st-century Indian short story writers
Novelists from Kerala
21st-century Indian novelists
Indian women columnists
Indian columnists
Indian women journalists
Journalists from Kerala
20th-century Indian short story writers
20th-century Indian novelists
20th-century Indian women writers
20th-century Indian dramatists and playwrights
21st-century Indian women writers
Women writers from Kerala
Indian newspaper journalists
21st-century Indian journalists
20th-century Indian journalists
Screenwriters from Kerala
Malayalam screenwriters
Indian women screenwriters